The Zo people are an ethnic group which inhabit areas of India, Myanmar and the Chittagong hill tracts of Bangladesh. The word Zohnatlâk/Zo is used to describe an ethnic group, which is also known as the Chin, the Mizo, the Kuki, or a number of other names based on geographic distribution, that speaks the Kuki-Chin languages. They are from same origin which is known as Sinlung (also known as Chhinlung, Khur, Khul, etc,.). They spread throughout the northeastern states of India, northwestern Myanmar (mainly in Chin State, Sagaing Division and Arakan State) and the Chittagong Hill Tracts of Bangladesh. In northeastern India, they are present in Tripura, Nagaland, Mizoram, Manipur, Meghalaya and Assam.

The dispersal across international borders resulted from a British colonial policy that drew borders on political, rather than ethnic, grounds. They speak more than fifty dialects.

Names

Various names have been used for the Zo peoples, but the individual groups generally acknowledge descent from ancestral Chin-Kuki. Among the more prominent names given to this group are "Chin" and "Zomi" generally in Myanmar, and "Mizo","Chin", "Kuki" and "Zomi", generally in India.

In the literature, the term Kuki first appeared in the writings of Rawlins when he wrote about the tribes of the Chittagong Hill Tracts. It referred to a "wild tribe" comprising numerous clans. These clans shared a common past, culture, customs and tradition. They spoke in dialects that had a common root language belonging to the Tibeto-Burman group.

The origin of the name "Chin" is unknown . Later the British used the compound term "Chin-Kuki-Mizo" to group the Chin Kuki language speaking people, and the Government of India inherited this. Missionaries chose to employ the term Chin to christen those on the Burmese side and the term Zomi on the Indian side of the border. Chin nationalist leaders in Burma's Chin State popularized the term "Chin" following Burma's independence from Britain.

Beginning in the 1990s, the generic names Chin and Zomi have been rejected by some for "Zomi", a name used by a group speaking Northern Zomish languages, including the Zomi. The speakers of the Northern Chin-Kuki languages are sometimes lumped together as the Zomi's.Some Zomi nationalists have stated that the use of the label Chin would mean subtle domination by Burmese groups.

The term "Mizo" (poetic version of "Zomi"), was incorporated in the name of the Indian state Mizoram.

Geography 

They are spread out in the contiguous regions of Northeast India, Northwest Burma (Myanmar), and the Chittagong Hill Tracts in Bangladesh. In India, they are most prominent in Manipur, Nagaland, Assam and Mizoram. Some fifty Zo peoples are recognised as scheduled tribes.

Popular culture
The first Zomi-language movie to receive a full-length theatrical debut was a 2021 English-Zomi bilingual film, written and directed by Burmese refugee Thang Mung, called Thorn in the Center of the Heart. The film first premiered in Michigan, where Mung was resettled by U.S. refugee services as a teenager.

Notable Zo people

 Mary Kom 
 Henry Van Thio
 Zoramthanga 
 Lalthlamuong Keivom
 Khai Kam
 Pau Cin Hau
 Chin Sian Thang

See also
 Kuki–Paite ethnic clash of 1997–1998
 Leen Nupa
 Kennedy Peak (Myanmar)
 Rih Dil
 Zomi Nationalism
 Mizo National Front Uprising
 Prophecy of Thimthuahkhat, Thimthuahhnih and Zoram Khawvar

References

Ethnic groups in Bangladesh
Ethnic groups in Manipur
Ethnic groups in Myanmar
Tribes of Assam
Ethnic groups in Northeast India
Ethnic groups in South Asia
Hill people